Djaimilia Pereira de Almeida is a Portuguese novelist and essayist of partial African descent. She was born in Luanda, Angola, in 1982, but grew up near Lisbon. She completed a PhD in literary theory from the University of Lisbon. She is the author of Esse Cabelo [That Hair], Ajudar a cair, Luanda, Lisboa, Paraíso, Pintado com o pé and A visão das plantas. Her writing has appeared in granta.com, Blog da Companhia das Letras, Granta Portugal, Serrote, Zum, Pessoa, Ler, Buala, and elsewhere. She is a contributor for the Brazilian magazine Quatro Cinco Um.

That Hair was released in an English translation by Eric M. B. Becker in 2020.

Awards 
Luanda, Lisboa, Paraíso was awarded the Prémio Literário Fundação Inês de Castro, 2018; the Prémio Literário Fundação Eça de Queiroz, 2019; and the Prêmio Oceanos, 2019.

Books 

 2015, Esse Cabelo. Teorema. .
 2017, Esse Cabelo. Leya. .
 2017, Ajudar a cair. Fundação Francisco Manuel dos Santos. .
 2018, Luanda, Lisboa, Paraíso. Companhia das Letras. .
 2019, Luanda, Lisboa, Paraíso. Companhia das Letras / Brazil. .
 2019, Pintado com o pé. Relógio D’Água Editores. .
 2019, A Visão das Plantas. Relógio D'Água Editores. .

References 

1982 births
Living people
Portuguese women novelists
21st-century Portuguese novelists
21st-century Portuguese women writers
People from Luanda
Angolan emigrants to Portugal
University of Lisbon alumni